Hypsopygia resectalis is a species of snout moth in the genus Hypsopygia. It was described by Julius Lederer in 1863 and is known from Venezuela.

References

Moths described in 1863
Pyralini